Shiva Simha Singh ( Maithil: शिव सिंह ) was the King of Oiniwar dynasty in Mithila. He is also known as Sivasimha (शिवसिंह). He was very handsome and highly intelligent, so he was also called as Rūpanārāyana. He was the King of Mithila in India and Nepal. He declared himself to be independent King and stopped paying taxes to Tughlak empire. Due to his decision to challenge authority of Tughlaks empire, Ibrahim Shah Tughlak attacked Mithila. In the battle, King Sivasimha was arrested by the Tughlak army but some scholars claimed that the King Sivasimha had martyred in the battle and similarly some scholars claimed that the King Sivasimha got missing from the battle. These are some disputes on the death of the King Sivasimha. The great Maithili poet Vidyapati was the royal priest in the court of the Kingdom of the King Sivasimha and also his friend.

Earlier Life 
King Sivasimha was born in a Maithil Brahmin family in Mithila. His father name was King Devasimha. He was the King of Mithila. His mother was Hasini Devi. King Sivasimha was married to six wives. Queen Lakhima Devi was the most famous and scholarly wife of the King Sivasimha. She ruled Mithila from Banauliraj in Nepal for 12 years since 1416 AD to 1428 AD. She sacrificed herself into fire on a Sati ritual, after the 12 years waiting for the King Sivasimha. Padmavati was the eldest wife of the King Sivasimha. She also ruled Mithila for 3 years.

Rule 
King Sivasimha ruled the Kingdom of Mithila mainly between 1413 AD to 1416 AD around three years nine months. But he was actively taking part in the administration of the Kingdom from his age of 15 years, when his father Devasimha was alive.  He transferred his capital from Devakuli to Gajarathapur ( also known as Shiv Singhpur ) near Darbhanga .

Legacy 
The people of Mithila remember him for digging several large tanks in several villages of the Kingdom. Among these tanks, the tanks in villages Rajokhari, Barh, etc., are notable which are associated with various proverbs. He issued gold coins. Two specimens of the gold coins were found at Pipra village of Champaran district in 1913. On those coins, there was "Shri" and "Shiva" on the obverse and reverse sides respectively which indicates that the coins belonging to the reigning period of the King Sivasimha. He granted Bisfi village in the present Madhubani district to his friend Vidyapati for his poems Kirtilata and Kirtipataka. He is also said to have erected a Masoleum known as Mamoon Bhanja at Jaruha, near Hajipur.

Wars 
In his copper plate grant to Vidyapati, he claimed to have won kings of Gauda and Gajjanpur.

Origin of his dynasty 
The Oiniwar Dynasty of Mithila was originated from Oini village of Muzaffarpur district in the Mithila region of the present Bihar state in 1324 AD. The period of the dynasty was between 1325 AD to 1695 AD. The first King of the Oiniwar Dynasty was King Nath Thakur. He became King of Mithila in 1324 AD.

References 

Mithila
15th century in Asia
Indian royalty
History of Bihar